Crash Course in Science are an American post-punk band. The band was formed in 1979 in Philadelphia by Dale Feliciello, Mallory Yago and Michael Zodorozny. They avoided the sounds of conventional instrumentation by using toy instruments and kitchen appliances to augment distorted guitar, drums and synthesised beats.  Championed by local radio station WXPN DJ Lee Paris they recorded the single "Cakes in the Home" (with the B-side containing "Kitchen Motors" and "Mechanical Breakdown") for his Go Go label (GO GO R001).  This was followed by Signals from Pier Thirteen (Press Records	P 2001) in 1981, produced by John Wicks at Third Story Recordings.

In the years following the band's initial break-up, Crash Course in Science's music developed a cult following among techno and electro musicians, and the band have been cited as an influence on the 2000s electroclash scene. In 2009, they reunited for tours, and in 2011, Schematic Records released a Signals from Pier Thirteen re-issue, as well as Near Marineland, an album originally recorded by the band in 1981 before being shelved. In 2017, the band released a new album titled Situational Awareness.

Discography

Albums
 Near Marineland (2011)
 Situational Awareness (2017)

EPs
 Signals from Pier Thirteen (1981)

References

External links
 Official website

Experimental musical groups
Musical groups established in 1979
Musical groups disestablished in 1981
Musical groups reestablished in 2009
Electronic music groups from Pennsylvania
Minimal wave groups